Ogden Mills & Ruth Livingston Mills State Park, also known as Mills Memorial State Park, is a  state park located in Staatsburg in Dutchess County, New York. The park is bounded by the Hudson River on the west.

It is part of the  area known as Mills-Norrie State Park, which comprises Margaret Lewis Norrie State Park and Ogden Mills & Ruth Livingston Mills State Park.

The park's central feature is Staatsburgh State Historic Site, a Beaux-Arts mansion designed by McKim, Mead, and White.  Built between 1895 and 1896, the Gilded Age mansion features 65 rooms, 14 bathrooms, and 23 fireplaces.  The furnished house is open for tours, programs and special events.  Other park features include trails, cabins, tent sites, RV sites, fishing opportunities, picnic area, recreation programs, restaurant, cross-country skiing and sledding.

Dinsmore golf course

The park also features Dinsmore golf course, a public golf course for 9 or 18 holes.  A restaurant is available.

LAT: 41.8520456591
LONG: -73.9352416992

Nearby state parks and historic sites
 Margaret Lewis Norrie State Park (Dutchess County)
 Staatsburgh State Historic Site (Dutchess County)
 Clermont State Historic Site (Columbia County)
 Olana State Historic Site (Columbia County)
 Lake Taghkanic State Park (Columbia County)
 James Baird State Park (Dutchess County)

See also
 List of New York state parks

External links
 New York State Parks: Ogden Mills & Ruth Livingston Mills State Park

References

State parks of New York (state)
Parks on the Hudson River
Parks in Dutchess County, New York